Gregory T. White is a United States Air Force major general who has served as the Director of Space Operations of the National Guard Bureau since January 2020. Previously, he was the Air National Guard Assistant to the Director of Operations and Communications of the Air Force Space Command from August 2018 to January 2020.

References

Living people
Place of birth missing (living people)
Recipients of the Legion of Merit
United States Air Force generals
United States Air Force personnel of the Gulf War
United States Air Force personnel of the Iraq War
Year of birth missing (living people)